Paige van der Westhuizen (born 23 April 2003) is a Zimbabwean swimmer. She represented Zimbabwe at the 2019 World Aquatics Championships held in Gwangju, South Korea. She competed in the women's 100 metre freestyle and women's 200 metre freestyle events. In both events she did not advance to compete in the semi-finals.

References

External links
 

2003 births
Living people
Place of birth missing (living people)
Zimbabwean female freestyle swimmers